Roberto García (born 8 September 1937) is a former Salvadoran cyclist. He competed in the team time trial at the 1968 Summer Olympics in Mexico City.

References

1937 births
Living people
Salvadoran male cyclists
Olympic cyclists of El Salvador
Cyclists at the 1968 Summer Olympics